Laura Lindemann (born 26 June 1996) is a German triathlete. She competed in the women's event at the 2016 Summer Olympics where she finished in 28th place and in the women's event at the 2020 Summer Olympics where she finished in 8th place. She also competed in the mixed relay event at the 2020 Summer Olympics.

References

External links
 

1996 births
Living people
German female triathletes
Olympic triathletes of Germany
Triathletes at the 2016 Summer Olympics
Sportspeople from Berlin
Triathletes at the 2020 Summer Olympics
20th-century German women
21st-century German women